The discography of Fireflight, a Christian rock band, which consists of 1 independent album, 5 studio albums, 2 independent EPs and 17 singles.

Albums

Independent 

Released in 2002, Glam-rök was the first album released by the band. It was produced by, then lead guitarist, Justin Cox. Stylistically the album sounds different from later releases.

Studio

EPs

On the Subject of Moving Forward was released October 19, 2004 as five-song EP. "Liar", "Call" (re-titled "Serenity"), and "Waiting" were re-recorded for The Healing of Harms.

Singles

References

Discographies of American artists
Christian music discographies